Kelly Askew  (born November 6, 1971) is a Canadian former professional ice hockey and inline hockey player.

Following four years of NCAA play with the RPI Engineers men's ice hockey team, Askew played inline hockey with the 1995 New Jersey Rockin' Rollers of Roller Hockey International, and then spent the 1995-96 season with Canada men's national ice hockey team. He went on to play seven seasons in the professional leagues winning the 1998-99 British ice hockey league championship with the Manchester Storm. He was also selected a 2000–01 West Coast Hockey League First Team All-Star.

Awards and honours

References

External links

1971 births
Living people
Canadian ice hockey left wingers
Frankfurt Lions players
Long Beach Ice Dogs (WCHL) players
Manchester Storm (1995–2002) players
Newcastle Cobras players
RPI Engineers men's ice hockey players
San Diego Gulls (ECHL) players
Ice hockey people from Calgary
New Jersey Rockin' Rollers players
Canadian expatriate sportspeople in the United States
Canadian expatriate ice hockey players in England
Canadian expatriate ice hockey players in Germany